The Kane Rocks form an east–west trending ridge,  long, forming a rock median between the upper reaches of Koski Glacier and Vandament Glacier in the Dominion Range, Antarctica. The ridge was named by the Advisory Committee on Antarctic Names for Henry Scott Kane, a United States Antarctic Research Program cosmic rays scientist at South Pole Station, winter 1964, and a member of the South Pole—Queen Maud Land Traverse I and II, 1964–65 and 1965–66.

References

Ridges of the Ross Dependency
Dufek Coast